Silent Hill may refer to:

Silent Hill, a series of video games:
Silent Hill (video game), the first game in the series, released in 1999
Silent Hills, a game cancelled in 2015
Silent Hill (comics), a 2004-08 comic book series based on the video game series
Silent Hill (film series), a live action film series based on the video game series
Silent Hill (film), the first film in the series, released in 2006
"Silent Hill" (song), a 2022 song by Kendrick Lamar and Kodak Black